The Gnatcatchers are a family of small passerine birds called Polioptilidae. The 21 species occur in North and South America (except for the far south and the high Andean regions). Most species of this mainly tropical and subtropical group are resident, but the blue-grey gnatcatcher of the United States and southern Canada migrates south in winter. They are close relatives of the wrens.

Description
These dainty birds are intermediate between Old World warblers and wrens in their structure and habits, moving restlessly through foliage seeking insects. The gnatcatchers are mainly soft bluish grey in colour, and have the typical insectivore's long sharp bill. Many species have distinctive black head patterns (especially males) and long, regularly cocked, black-and-white tails. The skulking gnatwrens are browner, more thickset, and with proportionally shorter tails and longer bills.

Distribution and habitat
They are distributed from North to South America, with the exception of the far south and high Andean regions. Gnatwrens typically occur in the undergrowth of dense, often humid, forest, while gnatcatchers, depending on the species involved, occur in anything from dry scrubby habitats (e.g. the California gnatcatcher) to the canopy of humid Amazonian forest (e.g. the Guianan gnatcatcher). The North American species nest in bushes or trees, but the breeding behavior of several of the Neotropical species is essentially unknown.

Taxonomy and systematics

A species new to science, the critically endangered Iquitos gnatcatcher Polioptila clementsi, was first described in 2005. This species is a member of the Guianan gnatcatcher Polioptila guianensis complex, which recently has been proposed split into three species (four with the Iquitos gnatcatcher), but not all authorities have accepted this (e.g. SACC). Furthermore, other groups should possibly be split, notably the tropical gnatcatcher Polioptila plumbea and masked gnatcatcher Polioptila dumicola complexes, but at present scientific papers on these matters are lacking.

The family contains 21 species divided into 3 genera:
Ramphocaenus (2 species) – gnatwrens
Microbates (2 species) – gnatwrens
Polioptila (17 species) – gnatcatchers

References

External links
Gnatcatcher videos on the Internet Bird Collection

Taxa named by Spencer Fullerton Baird